Jakarta School of Theological Philosophy or Jakarta Theological Seminary (Sekolah Tinggi Filsafat Theologi Jakarta,  STFT Jakarta) is the oldest Christian theological college and university in Indonesia. It was founded in 1934.

References

External links

Schools in Indonesia
Seminaries and theological colleges in Indonesia
Educational institutions established in 1934
1934 establishments in the Dutch East Indies
Protestant universities and colleges in Asia